The Closteriaceae are one of four families of Charophyte green algae in the order Desmidiales (desmids).

References

External links

Scientific references

Scientific databases

Zygnematophyceae families
Desmidiales